Jack King (10 December 1904 – 21 January 1979) was a former Australian rules footballer who played with Carlton in the Victorian Football League (VFL).

Notes

External links 

Jack King's profile at Blueseum

1904 births
1979 deaths
Carlton Football Club players
Eaglehawk Football Club players
Australian rules footballers from Victoria (Australia)